Checheng Township is a rural township in Pingtung County, Taiwan.

History
During the Kingdom of Tungning, it was called "Firewood City". During Qing Dynasty rule, it was renamed to the current name, meaning "Car City".

Geography

Area: 
Population: 8,160 (February 2023)

Administrative divisions
The township comprises 11 villages: Baoli, Fuan, Fuxing, Haikou, Houwan, Puqi, Sheliao, Tianzhong, Tongpu, Wenquan and Xinjie.

Education
 National Pingtung University

Tourist attractions
 Checheng Fu'an Temple
 Kenting National Park
 National Museum of Marine Biology and Aquarium
 Sichongxi Hot Spring
 Dongyuan Forest Recreation Area and Dongyuan Wet Grassland 
 Shihmen Ancient battle Field and Mudan Incident Memorial Park  
 Syuhai Grassland Recreation Area 
 Hsi Chung River Hot Spring  
 HaiKou 
 Gourmet: Huang's peeled mung bean desert

Notable natives
 Pan Men-an, Magistrate of Pingtung County

References

External links

 Checheng Township Office, Pingtung County Government 

Townships in Pingtung County